KYPA (1230 AM AM 1230 JBC) is a Korean-language radio station in Los Angeles, California. It is owned by Woori Media Group, LLC.

KYPA is one of four radio stations in the greater Los Angeles area that broadcast entirely in Korean; the others are KMPC, KGBN, and KFOX.

The format includes various shows that serve the largest Korean population in the United States. They include talk shows, newscasts, variety shows, and popular music.

KGFJ went on the air in 1926. It is noted for being the first radio station in the United States to adopt a 24-hour broadcast schedule. In 1950, it became the flagship station for the short-lived Progressive Broadcasting System radio network.

From the 1960s to around 1997, and again in the early 2000s, the programming consisted of R&B, classic soul, and gospel music. For a short time in the late 1970s, after the ratings success of similarly-formatted KDAY, the call letters were changed to KKTT, "The Cat," in an attempt to modernize KGFJ's image. During the Los Angeles riots in 1992, KGFJ briefly adopted a talk format.  During the 1960s and early 1970s, KGFJ was a well-respected and influential soul music outlet, with many top name DJs, including Hunter Hancock, Lucky Pierre, Larry McCormick and the Magnificent Montague. KGFJ also had a popular Sunday morning talk show called, "Pat's Points", hosted by Pat (Patricia) Newman (1935-1981), which featured guests.  Among the many personalities heard on the station in the 1960s were Johnny Magnus, Rudy Harvey, Herman Griffith, Curtis Troupe, Jim Randolph, Tom Reed, Roland Bynum [who replaced Montague when he retired, as Soulfinger], Frankie Crocker, Johnny Soul (Ron Samuels) and Russ O'Hara.  KGFJ's studios were located on Melrose near the Hollywood Freeway overpass (the building has since been demolished).

A recreated example of KGFJ's R&B programming in the late 1950s can be found on Ron Jacobs' "Cruisin' 1959" (Increase Records INCR 5-2004). This recreation features DJ Hunter Hancock and includes several classic R&B songs of that era, contemporary commercials (e.g., Champion spark plugs, the Saturday Evening Post, and others), and DJ patter.

Between the two eras of black-oriented formats, KGFJ was KYPA, "Your Personal Achievement" radio. The station, as well as AM 820 in Chicago, aired mainly recorded content from motivational speakers, including condensed seminar speeches and interviews with business executives.

In 2002, the current format was adopted and the KYPA call sign restored.

In 2009, the station disconnected from its roof-top antenna (which retains significance as likely the last "hammock"  style antenna in the U.S.), and moved the transmitter to a site northwest of Dodger Stadium, using two of the towers in the six-tower array of co-owned KBLA.

KYPA is one of only two stations on 1230 kHz in the United States to use a directional antenna during daytime hours. Like nearly all others on that channel, it is nondirectional at night.

In August 2020, KYPA has recently expanded its reach using FM frequencies in different counties of Southern California. Counties include Orange, Irvine, Ventura and Kern County.

References

External links
FCC History Cards for KYPA

Cruisin' 1959 at reelradio.com

Korean-American culture in Los Angeles
Korean-language radio stations in the United States
YPA
Radio stations established in 1979
1979 establishments in California